Antisemitism (prejudice against and hatred of Jews) has increased greatly in the Arab world since the beginning of the 20th century, for several reasons: the dissolution and breakdown of the Ottoman Empire and traditional Islamic society; European influence, brought about by Western imperialism and Arab Christians; Nazi propaganda and relations between Nazi Germany and the Arab world; resentment over Jewish nationalism; the rise of Arab nationalism; and the widespread proliferation of anti-Jewish and anti-Zionist conspiracy theories.

Traditionally, Jews in the Muslim world were considered to be People of the Book and were subjected to dhimmi status. They were afforded relative security against persecution, provided they did not contest the varying inferior social and legal status imposed on them in Islamic states.

While there were antisemitic incidents before the 20th century, during this time antisemitism in the Arab world increased greatly. During the 1930s and the 1940s several Jewish communities in the Arab world suffered from pogroms. The status of Jews in Arab countries deteriorated further at the onset of the Arab–Israeli conflict. After the 1948 Arab–Israeli War, the Palestinian exodus, the creation of the State of Israel and Israeli victories during the wars of 1956 and 1967 were a severe humiliation to Israel's opponents—primarily Egypt, Syria, and Iraq. However, by the mid-1970s the vast majority of Jews had left Arab and Muslim countries, moving primarily to Israel, France, and the United States. The reasons for the exodus are varied and disputed.

By the 1980s, according to historian Bernard Lewis, the volume of antisemitic literature published in the Arab world, and the authority of its sponsors, seemed to suggest that classical antisemitism had become an essential part of Arab intellectual life, considerably more than in late 19th- and early 20th-century France and to a degree that has been compared to Nazi Germany. The rise of political Islam during the 1980s and afterwards provided a new mutation of Islamic antisemitism, giving the hatred of Jews a religious component.

In their 2008 report on contemporary Arab-Muslim antisemitism, the Israeli Intelligence and Terrorism Information Center dates the beginning of this phenomenon to the spread of classic European Christian antisemitism into the Arab world starting in the late 19th century. In 2014, the Anti-Defamation League published a global survey of worldwide antisemitic attitudes, reporting that in the Middle East, 74% of adults agreed with a majority of the survey's eleven antisemitic propositions, including that "Jews have too much power in international financial markets" and that "Jews are responsible for most of the world's wars."

Medieval times

Jews, along with Christians, Sabians, and Zoroastrians living under early and medieval Muslim rule were known as "People of the Book" to Muslims and subjected to the status of dhimmi ("protected" minority) in the lands conquered by Muslim Arabs, a status generally applied to Non-Muslim minorities that was later also extended to other Non-Muslims like Sikhs, Hindus, Jains, and Buddhists. Jews were generally seen as a religious group (not a separate race), thus being a part of the "Arab family".

Dhimmi were subjected to a number of restrictions, the application and severity of which varied with time and place. Restrictions included residency in segregated quarters, obligation to wear distinctive clothing such as the Yellow badge, public subservience to Muslims, prohibitions against proselytizing and against marrying Muslim women, and limited access to the legal system (the testimony of a Jew did not count if contradicted by that of a Muslim). Dhimmi had to pay a special poll tax (the jizya), which exempted them from military service, and also from payment of the zakat alms tax required of Muslims. In return, dhimmi were granted limited rights, including a degree of tolerance, community autonomy in personal matters, and protection from being killed outright. Jewish communities, like Christian ones, were typically constituted as semi-autonomous entities managed by their own laws and leadership, who carried the responsibility for the community towards the Muslim rulers.

By medieval standards, conditions for Jews under Islam were generally more formalized and better than those of Jews in Christian lands, in part due to the sharing of minority status with Christians in these lands. There is evidence for this claim in that the status of Jews in lands with no Christian minority was usually worse than their status in lands with one. For example, there were numerous incidents of massacres and ethnic cleansing of Jews in North Africa, especially in Morocco, Libya, and Algeria where eventually Jews were forced to live in ghettos. Decrees ordering the destruction of synagogues were enacted in the Middle Ages in Egypt, Syria, Iraq, and Yemen. At certain times in Yemen, Morocco, and Baghdad, Jews were forced to convert to Islam or face the death penalty.

The situation where Jews both enjoyed cultural and economic prosperity at times, but were widely persecuted at other times, was summarised by G. E. Von Grunebaum:

It would not be difficult to put together the names of a very sizable number of Jewish subjects or citizens of the Islamic area who have attained to high rank, to power, to great financial influence, to significant and recognized intellectual attainment; and the same could be done for Christians. But it would again not be difficult to compile a lengthy list of persecutions, arbitrary confiscations, attempted forced conversions, or pogroms.

Views in modernity
Some scholars hold that Arab antisemitism in the modern world arose in the nineteenth century, against the backdrop of conflicting Jewish and Arab nationalism, and was imported into the Arab world primarily by nationalistically minded Christian Arabs (and only subsequently was it "Islamized"), Mark Cohen states. According to Bernard Lewis:

19th century
The Damascus affair was an accusation of ritual murder and a blood libel against Jews in Damascus in 1840. On February 5, 1840, Franciscan Capuchin friar Father Thomas and his Greek servant were reported missing, never to be seen again. The Turkish governor and the French consul Ratti-Menton believed accusations of ritual murder and blood libel, as the alleged murder occurred before the Jewish Passover. An investigation was staged, and Solomon Negrin, a Jewish barber, confessed under torture and accused other Jews. Two other Jews died under torture, and one (Moses Abulafia) converted to Islam to escape torture. More arrests and atrocities followed, culminating in 63 Jewish children being held hostage and mob attacks on Jewish communities throughout the Middle East. International outrage led to Ibrahim Pasha in Egypt ordering an investigation. Negotiations in Alexandria eventually secured the unconditional release and recognition of innocence of the nine prisoners still remaining alive (out of thirteen). Later in Constantinople, Moses Montefiore (leader of the British Jewish community) persuaded Sultan Abdülmecid I to issue a firman (edict) intended to halt the spread of blood libel accusations in the Ottoman Empire:

... and for the love we bear to our subjects, we cannot permit the Jewish nation, whose innocence for the crime alleged against them is evident, to be worried and tormented as a consequence of accusations which have not the least foundation in truth....

Nevertheless, the blood libel spread through the Middle East and North Africa: Aleppo (1810, 1850, 1875), Damascus (1840, 1848, 1890), Beirut (1862, 1874), Dayr al-Qamar (1847), Jerusalem (1847), Cairo (1844, 1890, 1901–02), Mansura (1877), Alexandria (1870, 1882, 1901–02), Port Said (1903, 1908), and Damanhur (1871, 1873, 1877, 1892).

The Dreyfus affair of the late 19th century had consequences in the Arab world. Passionate outbursts of antisemitism in France were echoed in areas of French influence, especially Maronite Lebanon. The Muslim Arab press, however, was sympathetic to the falsely accused Captain Dreyfus, and criticized the persecution of Jews in France.

20th century

Pre-state antisemitism 
While Arab antisemitism has increased in the wake of the Arab–Israeli conflict, there were pogroms against Jews prior to the establishment of the State of Israel in May 1948, including Nazi-inspired pogroms in Algeria in the 1930s, and attacks on the Jews of Iraq and Libya in the 1940s. In 1941, 180 Jews were murdered and 700 were injured in the anti-Jewish riots known as "the Farhud". Four hundred Jews were injured in violent demonstrations in Egypt in 1945 and Jewish property was vandalized and looted. In Libya, 130 Jews were killed and 266 injured. In December 1947, 13 Jews were killed in Damascus, including 8 children, and 26 were injured. In Aleppo, rioting resulted in dozens of Jewish casualties, damage to 150 Jewish homes, and the torching of 5 schools and 10 synagogues. In Yemen, 97 Jews were murdered and 120 injured.

Speculated causes 
Antisemitism in the Arab world increased in the 20th century, as resentment against Jewish immigration and Zionist activities in Palestine Mandate grew. Around this time, the fabricated antisemitic text The Protocols of the Elders of Zion started to become available in Palestine. A translation of the text in Arabic was done by an Arab Christian in Cairo in 1927 or 1928, this time as a published book. In March 1921, Musa Khazem El Husseini, Mayor of Jerusalem, told Winston Churchill "The Jews have been amongst the most active advocates of destruction in many lands. ... It is well known that the disintegration of Russia was wholly or in great part brought about by the Jews, and a large proportion of the defeat of Germany and Austria must also be put at their door."

Matthias Küntzel has suggested that the decisive transfer of Jewish conspiracy theory took place between 1937 and 1945 under the impact of Nazi propaganda targeted at the Arab world. According to Kuntzel, the Nazi Arabic radio service had a staff of 80 and broadcast every day in Arabic, stressing the similarities between Islam and Nazism and supported by the activities of the Grand Mufti of Jerusalem, Amin al-Husseini (who broadcast pro-Nazi propaganda from Berlin). Alongside al-Husseini's collaboration with the Nazis, cooperative political and military relationships between the Arab world and the Axis powers (Nazi Germany and Fascist Italy) were founded on shared antisemitic scorn and hostilities toward common enemies: the United Kingdom, France, and Zionism. The Nazi regime also provided funding to the Egyptian Moslem Brotherhood, which began calling for boycotts of Jewish businesses in 1936.
Bernard Lewis also describes Nazi influence in the Arab world, including its impact on Michel Aflaq, the principal founder of Ba'athist thought (which later dominated Syria and Iraq). After the promulgation of the Nuremberg Laws, Hitler received telegrams of congratulation from all over the Arab and Muslim world, especially from Morocco and Palestine, where the Nazi propaganda had been most active.... Before long political parties of the Nazi and Fascist type began to appear, complete with paramilitary youth organizations, colored shirts, strict discipline and more or less charismatic leaders. 

George Gruen attributes the increased animosity towards Jews in the Arab world to the defeat and breakdown of the Ottoman Empire and traditional Islamic society; domination by Western colonial powers under which Jews gained a disproportionately large role in the commercial, professional, and administrative life of the region; the rise of Arab nationalism, whose proponents sought the wealth and positions of local Jews through government channels; resentment over Jewish nationalism and the Zionist movement; and the readiness of unpopular Arab regimes to scapegoat local Jews for political purposes.

After the 1948 Arab–Israeli War, the Palestinian exodus, the creation of the state of Israel, and the independence of Arab countries from European control, conditions for Jews in the Arab world deteriorated. Over the next few decades, almost all would flee the Arab world, some willingly, and some under threat (see Jewish exodus from Arab and Muslim countries). In 1945 there were between 758,000 and 866,000 Jews (see table below) living in communities throughout the Arab world. Today, there are fewer than 8,000. In some Arab states, such as Libya (which was once around 3% Jewish), the Jewish community no longer exists; in other Arab countries, only a few hundred Jews remain.

Harvard University Professor Ruth R. Wisse claims that "anti-Semitism / Zionism has been the cornerstone of pan-Arab politics since the Second World War" and that it is the "strongest actual and potential source of unity" in the Arab world. This is because Jews and Israel function as substitutes for Western values that challenge the hegemony of religious and political power in the Middle East. Antisemitism is also malleable enough that it can unite right-wing and left-wing groups within the Arab world.

Robert Bernstein, founder of Human Rights Watch, says that antisemitism is "deeply ingrained and institutionalized" in "Arab nations in modern times".

Contemporary attitudes

Israeli Arabs

In 2003, Israeli-Arab Raed Salah, the leader of the northern branch of the Islamic Movement in Israel published the following poem in the Islamic Movement's periodical:
You Jews are criminal bombers of mosques,
Slaughterers of pregnant women and babies.
Robbers and germs in all times,
The Creator sentenced you to be loser monkeys,
Victory belongs to Muslims, from the Nile to the Euphrates.

During a speech in 2007, Salah accused Jews of using children's blood to bake bread. "We have never allowed ourselves to knead [the dough for] the bread that breaks the fast in the holy month of Ramadan with children's blood," he said. "Whoever wants a more thorough explanation, let him ask what used to happen to some children in Europe, whose blood was mixed in with the dough of the [Jewish] holy bread.".

Kamal Khatib, deputy leader of the northern branch of the Islamic movement, referred in one of his speeches to the Jews as "fleas".

Of all groups surveyed, a 2010 Pew Research global poll found that Israeli Arabs have the lowest rate of anti-Jewish attitudes in the Middle East.

Egypt

Egyptian Muslim Brotherhood leader Mohammed Mahdi Akef has denounced what he called "the myth of the Holocaust" in defending Iranian president Mahmoud Ahmadinejad's denial of it.

The Egyptian government-run newspaper, Al Akhbar, on April 29, 2002, published an editorial denying the Holocaust as a fraud. The next paragraph decries the failure of the Holocaust to eliminate all of the Jews:

With regard to the fraud of the Holocaust. ... Many French studies have proven that this is no more than a fabrication, a lie, and a fraud!! That is, it is a 'scenario' the plot of which was carefully tailored, using several faked photos completely unconnected to the truth. Yes, it is a film, no more and no less. Hitler himself, whom they accuse of Nazism, is in my eyes no more than a modest 'pupil' in the world of murder and bloodshed. He is completely innocent of the charge of frying them in the hell of his false Holocaust!!

The entire matter, as many French and British scientists and researchers have proven, is nothing more than a huge Israeli plot aimed at extorting the German government in particular and the European countries in general. But I, personally and in light of this imaginary tale, complain to Hitler, even saying to him from the bottom of my heart, 'If only you had done it, brother, if only it had really happened, so that the world could sigh in relief [without] their evil and sin.'

In an article in October 2000 columnist Adel Hammoda alleged in the state-owned Egyptian newspaper al-Ahram that Jews made Matza from the blood of (non-Jewish) children. Mohammed Salmawy, editor of Al-Ahram Hebdo, "defended the use of old European myths like the blood libel" in his newspapers.

In August 2010, Saudi columnist Iman Al-Quwaifli sharply criticized the "phenomenon of sympathy for Adolf Hitler and for Nazism in the Arab world", specifically citing the words of Hussam Fawzi Jabar, an Islamic cleric who justified Hitler's actions against the Jews in an Egyptian talk show one month earlier.

In an October 2012 sermon broadcast on Egyptian Channel 1 (which was attended by Egyptian President Muhammad Morsi) Futouh Abd Al-Nabi Mansour, the Head of Religious Endowment of the Matrouh Governorate, prayed (as translated by MEMRI):

Jordan

Jordan does not allow entry to Jews with visible signs of Judaism or even with personal religious items in their possession. The Jordanian ambassador to Israel replied to a complaint by a religious Jew denied entry that security concerns required that travelers entering the Hashemite Kingdom not do so with prayer shawls (Tallit) and phylacteries (Tefillin). Jordanian authorities state that the policy is in order to ensure the Jewish tourists' safety.

In July 2009, six Breslov Hasidim were deported after attempting entry into Jordan in order to visit the tomb of Aaron / Sheikh Harun on Mount Hor, near Petra, because of an alert from the Ministry of Tourism. The group had taken a ferry from Sinai, Egypt because they understood that Jordanian authorities were making it hard for visible Jews to enter from Israel. The Israeli Ministry of Foreign Affairs is aware of the issue.

Saudi Arabia

Hostility toward Jews is common in Saudi Arabian media, religious sermons, school curriculum, and official government policy.

Indoctrination against Jews is a part of school curriculum in Saudi Arabia.  Children are advised not to befriend Jews, are given false information about them (such as the claim that Jews worship the Devil), and are encouraged to engage in jihad against Jews.

Conspiracy theories about Jews are widely disseminated in Saudi Arabian state-controlled media.

According to the U.S. State Department, religious freedom "does not exist" in Saudi Arabia, and therefore, Jews may not freely practice their religion.

Syria

On March 2, 1974, the bodies of four Syrian Jewish women were discovered by border police in a cave in the Zabdani Mountains northwest of Damascus. Fara Zeibak 24, her sisters Lulu Zeibak 23, Mazal Zeibak 22 and their cousin Eva Saad 18, had contracted with a band of smugglers to flee Syria to Lebanon and eventually to Israel. The girls' bodies were found raped, murdered and mutilated. The police also found the remains of two Jewish boys, Natan Shaya 18 and Kassem Abadi 20, victims of an earlier massacre. Syrian authorities deposited the bodies of all six in sacks before the homes of their parents in the Jewish ghetto in Damascus.

In 1984 Syrian Defense Minister Mustafa Tlass published a book called The Matzah of Zion, which claimed that Jews had killed Christian children in Damascus to make Matzas (see Damascus affair). His book inspired the Egyptian TV series Horseman Without a Horse (see below) and a spinoff, The Diaspora, which led to Hezbollah's al-Manar being banned in Europe for broadcasting it.

Former Ku Klux Klan leader David Duke visited Syria in November 2005 and made a speech that was broadcast live on Syrian television.

Tunisia
For a personal account of the discrimination and physical attacks experienced by Jews in Tunisia the Jewish-Arab anti-colonialist writer Albert Memmi wrote:

At each crisis, with every incident of the slightest importance, the mob would go wild, setting fire to Jewish shops. This even happened during the Yom Kippur War. Tunisia's President, Habib Bourguiba, has in all probability never been hostile to the Jews, but there was always that notorious "delay", which meant that the police arrived on the scene only after the shops had been pillaged and burnt. Is it any wonder that the exodus to France and Israel continued and even increased?

On November 30, 2012, prominent Tunisian imam Sheikh Ahmad Al-Suhayli of Radès, told his followers during a live broadcast on Hannibal TV that "God wants to destroy this [Tunisian] sprinkling of Jews and is sterilizing the wombs of Jewish women." This was the fourth time incitement against Jews has been reported in the public sphere since the overthrow of Tunisian President Zine El Abidine Ben Ali in 2011, thus prompting Jewish community leaders to demand security protection from the Tunisian government. Al-Suhayli subsequently posted a video on the Internet in which he claimed that his statements had been misinterpreted.

On January 18, 2021, Tunisian president Kais Saied was caught on video telling a crowd that "We know very well who the people are who are controlling the country today. It is the Jews who are doing the stealing, and we need to put an end to it." Saied's office responded that the president's words had been misheard and that he meant to say something else instead of Jews. Two days later, Saied publicly apologized for his statements, holding a phone call with Djerba's chief rabbi, Haim Bitan in which he expressed regret for his statements.

The history of the Jews in Tunisia goes back to Roman times. Before 1948, the Jewish population of Tunisia reached a peak of 110,000. Today it has a Jewish community of less than 2,000 people.

Palestinian territories

The Hamas, an offshoot of the Egyptian Muslim Brotherhood, has a foundational statement of principles, or "covenant" that claims that the French revolution, the Russian revolution, colonialism and both world wars were created by the Zionists. It also claims the Freemasons and Rotary clubs are Zionist fronts and refers to the Protocols of the Elders of Zion.
Claims that Jews and Freemasons were behind the French Revolution originated in Germany in the mid-19th century.

Mahmoud Abbas, leader of the PLO, published a Ph.D. thesis (at Moscow University) in 1982, called The Secret Connection between the Nazis and the Leaders of the Zionist Movement.
His doctoral thesis later became a book, The Other Side: the Secret Relationship Between Nazism and Zionism, which, following his appointment as Palestinian Prime Minister in 2003, was heavily criticized as an example of Holocaust denial. In his book, Abbas wrote:
It seems that the interest of the Zionist movement, however, is to inflate this figure [of Holocaust deaths] so that their gains will be greater. This led them to emphasize this figure [six million] in order to gain the solidarity of international public opinion with Zionism. Many scholars have debated the figure of six million and reached stunning conclusions—fixing the number of Jewish victims at only a few hundred thousand.Gross, Tom. Abu Mazen and the Holocaust

Lebanon
Hezbollah's Al-Manar TV channel has often been accused of airing antisemitic broadcasts, blaming the Jews for a Zionist conspiracy against the Arab world, and often airing excerpts from the Protocols of the Elders of Zion, which the Encyclopædia Britannica describes as a "fraudulent document that served as a pretext and rationale for anti-Semitism in the early 20th century".

Al-Manar recently aired a drama series, called The Diaspora, which is based on historical antisemitic allegations. BBC reporters who watched the series said that:  Correspondents who have viewed The Diaspora note that it quotes extensively from the Protocols of the Elders of Zion, a notorious 19th-century publication used by the Nazis among others to fuel race hatred. 

In another incident, an Al-Manar commentator recently referred to "Zionist attempts to transmit AIDS to Arab countries". Al-Manar officials deny broadcasting antisemitic incitement and state that their position is anti-Israeli, not antisemitic. However, Hezbollah has directed strong rhetoric both against Israel and Jews, and it has cooperated in publishing and distributing outright antisemitic literature. The government of Lebanon has not criticized continued broadcast of antisemitic material on television.

Due to protests by the CRIF umbrella group of French Jews regarding allegations of antisemitic content, French Prime Minister Jean-Pierre Raffarin called for a ban on Al-Manar broadcasting in France on December 2, 2004, just two weeks after al-Manar was authorised to continue broadcasting in Europe by France's media watchdog agency. On December 13, 2004, France's highest administrative court banned Hizbullah's Al-Manar TV station on the grounds that it consistently incites racial hatred and antisemitism.

Yemen

The 1940s and the establishment of Israel saw rapid emigration of Jews out of Yemen, in the wake of anti-Jewish riots and massacres. By the late 1990s, only several hundred remained, mainly in a northwestern mountainous region named Sa'ada and town of Raida. Houthi members put up notes on the Jews' doors, accusing them of corrupting Muslim morals. Eventually, the Houthi leaders sent threatening messages to the Jewish community: "We warn you to leave the area immediately.... We give you a period of 10 days, or you will regret it."

On 28 March 2021, 13 Jews were forced by the Houthis to leave Yemen, leaving four elderly Jews the only Jews still in Yemen.

Arab newspapers
Many Arab newspapers, such as Al-Hayat Al-Jadidah, the Palestinian Authority's official newspaper, often write that "the Jews" control all the world's governments, and that "the Jews" plan genocide on all the Arabs in the West Bank. Others write less sensational stories, and state that Jews have too much of an influence in the United States government. Often the leaders of other nations are said to be controlled by Jews. Articles in many official Arab government newspapers claim that The Protocols of the Elders of Zion, reflects facts, and thus points to an international Jewish conspiracy to take over the world.

Horseman Without a Horse
In 2001–2002, Arab Radio and Television produced a 30-part television miniseries entitled Horseman Without a Horse, starring prominent Egyptian actor Mohamed Sobhi, which contains dramatizations of The Protocols of the Elders of Zion. The United States and Israel criticized Egypt for airing the program, which includes racist falsehoods that have a history of being used "as a pretext for persecuting Jews".

Opinion polling
In 2008 a Pew Research Center survey found that negative views concerning Jews were most common in the three predominantly Arab nations polled, with 97% of Lebanese having unfavorable opinion of Jews, 95% in Egypt and 96% in Jordan.

See also 
 Contemporary imprints of The Protocols of the Elders of Zion
 Covenant of Umar I
 Dhimmi
 Islam and antisemitism
 Jewish exodus from Arab and Muslim lands
 Jizya
 Mellah
 Pact of Umar II
 Qutbism
 Racism in the Arab world

Notes

References

Bibliography
 
 Lewis, Bernard (1984). The Jews of Islam. Princeton: Princeton University Press. 
 Lewis, Bernard (1999). Semites and anti-Semites. 
 Gerber, Jane S. (1986). "Anti-Semitism and the Muslim World". In History and Hate: The Dimensions of Anti-Semitism, ed. David Berger. Jewish Publications Society. 
 Bostom, Andrew G. The Legacy of Islamic Antisemitism: From Sacred texts to Solemn History. Prometheus Books. 2008. 
 
 Laqueur, Walter. The Changing Face of Antisemitism: From Ancient Times To The Present Day. Oxford University Press. 2006. 
 Poliakov, Leon (1997). "Anti-Semitism". Encyclopaedia Judaica (CD-ROM Edition Version 1.0). Ed. Cecil Roth. Keter Publishing House. 
 Segev, Tom. One Palestine, Complete: Jews and Arabs Under the British Mandate. Trans. Haim Watzman. New York: Henry Holt and Company, 2001.
 
 
 Wistrich, Robert S. Hitler's Apocalypse: Jews and the Nazi Legacy. Weidenfeld & Nicolson. 1985. 
 Wistrich, Robert S. A Lethal Obsession: Anti-Semitism from Antiquity to the Global Jihad. Random House. 2010.

External links

 Arab Anti-Semitism in 1998/99 – summary of Arab antisemitism, by the University of Tel Aviv
 S.RES.366  Urging the Government of Egypt and other Arab governments not to allow their government-controlled television stations to broadcast any program that lends legitimacy to the Protocols of the Elders of Zion, and for other purposes. (Passed/agreed to in Senate on November 20, 2002).
 MEMRI Organization that monitors Middle-Eastern media for antisemitism. See MEMRI.

 
Arab world
Discrimination in the Arab world
Arab world